The following highways are numbered 653:

United States
  Nevada State Route 653, an east–west state highway in Washoe County, Nevada, serving the city of Reno
  Pennsylvania Route 653, a 26-mile-long (42 km) state highway in Fayette and Somerset counties in Pennsylvania, United States
  Puerto Rico Highway 653, an east-west highway in Arecibo and Hatillo municipalities in Puerto Rico
  Virginia State Route 653, a secondary route in Virginia